You Do You may refer to::

 "You Do You", a 2020 song by Dillon Francis
 "You Do You", a 2020 song by Graace
 "You Do You", a song by Jason Mraz featuring Tiffany Haddish, from the 2020 album Look for the Good